The Sleeping Sickness is a collaborative album by SubArachnoid Space and Walking Timebombs, released on December 7, 1999 BYElsie & Jack Recordings.

Track listing

Personnel 
Adapted from The Sleeping Sickness liner notes.
Musicians
 Scott Ayers – guitar, engineering, mixing, recording
 Melynda Jackson – guitar
 Mason Jones – guitar
 Michelle Schreiber – drums
 Jason Stein – bass guitar
Production and additional personnel
 James Rodriguez – mastering
 Phil Rodriguez – photography

Release history

References

External links 
 

1999 albums
Collaborative albums
SubArachnoid Space albums
Walking Timebombs albums